Krieger is a lunar impact crater on the eastern part of the Oceanus Procellarum. It is located to the north-northwest of the flooded crater Prinz, and north-northeast of the prominent ray crater Aristarchus. To the northwest lies the small Wollaston.

In the past the floor of Krieger has been flooded by basaltic lava, leaving only a low, circular, somewhat polygonal ridge formed by the rim. The southern rim is broken across by the small Van Biesbroeck, and there is a small gap in the western rim. A meandering rille leads away from this break toward the northwest.

Nearby craters
Two tiny craters next to the eastern rim have been designated Rocco and Ruth. Rocco was previously designated as Krieger D before being named by the IAU.

The nearby surface to the southwest contains a number of rilles belonging to the Rimae Aristarchus and Rimae Prinz rille systems. Further to the east-southeast are the Montes Harbinger mountains.

Satellite craters
By convention these features are identified on lunar maps by placing the letter on the side of the crater midpoint that is closest to Krieger.

The following craters have been renamed by the IAU.
 Krieger B — See Van Biesbroeck (crater).

References

External links
 LTO-39A1 Krieger — L&PI topographic map of the crater and vicinity.
 39A1S1(50) Van Biesbroeck, detailed map of Krieger and Van Biesbroeck
 

Impact craters on the Moon